The University of Portsmouth is a public university in Portsmouth, England. It is one of only four universities in the South East of England rated as Gold in the Government's Teaching Excellence Framework. With approximately 28,280 undergraduate and postgraduate students, the university is the 25th largest in the United Kingdom by higher education student enrolments. Comprising five faculties, 24 schools and several other services, the university employs approximately 3,500 staff.  

In the 2023 edition of the Good University Guide – compiled by The Times and Sunday Times – the university ranked 62nd out of the 132 universities in the United Kingdom. In the Times Higher Education REF ranking, the university was ranked third in research power for modern post-1992 universities. 

Research conducted by the university has a significant global impact; in the latest edition of the Research Excellence Framework, 77 per cent of research submitted by the university was ranked as world-leading or internationally excellent, with impacts across society, health, culture and the environment.

History
The roots of the university can be traced back to the Portsmouth and Gosport School of Science and Art. which opened in 1870 and was funded by subscription. Technical education (including science-based subjects) later became the responsibility of the local authority, which founded Portsmouth Municipal Technical Institute in 1894 to fulfil this function. However, the city required a permanent purpose-built home for technical education and as a consequence Portsmouth Municipal College was constructed on a site behind Portsmouth Guildhall. Portsmouth Municipal College opened in 1908 (the new college replaced Portsmouth Municipal Technical Institute, although many of the staff transferred to the new institution) and the building also incorporated the College of Art, Portsmouth Day Training College for teachers and a public library. The original college building is still in use by the University of Portsmouth and is now known as Park Building.
 
In 1911 two student unions were established for male and female students; as early records from the student union newspaper The Galleon show.

From 1945 to 1960 the college diversified its syllabus adding arts and humanities subjects after World War II, in response to a decline in the need for engineering skills. In 1953 the institution changed its name to Portsmouth College of Technology. The college was renamed Portsmouth Polytechnic after it gained polytechnic status in 1969 and by the late 1980s was one of the largest polytechnics in the UK. On 7 July 1992 the inauguration of the University of Portsmouth was celebrated at a ceremony at Portsmouth Guildhall. As a new university, it could validate its own degrees, under the provision of the Further and Higher Education Act 1992. 

On Friday 4 May 2018, the University of Portsmouth was revealed as the main shirt sponsor of Portsmouth F.C. for the 2018–19, 2019–20 and 2020–21 seasons.

In December 2022, an employment tribunal ruled that when the university failed to reappoint Dr Kajal Sharma to her job, it had racially discriminated against her.

Campuses
The university is split between the University Quarter, which is centred around the Portsmouth Guildhall area, and the Langstone Campus.

Langstone Campus
Langstone is the smaller of the two campuses, located in Milton on the eastern edge of Portsea Island. The campus overlooks Langstone Harbour and it is home to the university's sports grounds.

Langstone Campus used to be home of the university's School of Languages and Area Studies, which has since moved into Park Building in the University Quarter. It also used to be home to three halls of residence: Queen Elizabeth Queen Mother (QEQM), Trust Hall and Langstone Flats. These used to house 565 students, however these have now been closed, in favour of those closer to the majority of the university buildings. These have now been demolished.

University Quarter
The University Quarter is a collection of university buildings located around the centre of the city. This area contains most of the university's teaching facilities and nearly all of the Student Halls of residence (except the Langstone student village and two halls (Rees Hall and Burrell House) located on Southsea Terrace).

The University Library (formerly the Frewen Library) was extended in 2006 at a cost of £11 million.  It was opened by the crime writer P. D. James. The university has also recently invested in the Faculty of Science, in particular by renovating the aluminium-clad main building, St Michael's.

A new faculty called "Creative and Cultural Industries" was opened in September 2006.

Military Technological College of Oman
On 7 June 2013, the University of Portsmouth announced its partnership with the Military Technological College of Oman. This involves the University of Portsmouth providing academic guidance and academic accreditation for the education of 4,200 students with technical roles in armed services and a few civilian employers in the Sultanate of Oman. This has been criticised by the student Amnesty International Society and by Campaign Against the Arms Trade who consider Oman an authoritarian regime, likely to use military capabilities on their own citizens or in regional conflicts.

Organisation and structure

Governance
Portsmouth is formally headed by the Chancellor, currently Karen Blackett. The Chancellor is largely a ceremonial role; Portsmouth is run day-to-day by the Vice-Chancellor, presently Graham Galbraith, along with a single integrated decision-making body known as the University Executive Board https://www.port.ac.uk/about-us/structure-and-governance/our-people/university-executive-board. This includes Pro Vice-Chancellors, the Director of Finance and the Executive Deans of Faculties, together with the Chief Operating Officer, the Director of Human Resources and the University Secretary and Clerk.

Faculties
The University of Portsmouth is composed of five faculties divided into 29 departments:

Faculty of Business and Law
Portsmouth Business School, with subject groups:
 Accounting and Financial Management
 Accounting with Finance
 Accounting, Economics and Finance
 Organisation Studies and Human Resource Management
 Marketing and Sales
 Operations and Systems Management
 Strategy, Enterprise and Innovation
 Portsmouth Law School

Faculty of Technology

 School of Civil Engineering and Surveying
 School of Computing
 Institute of Cosmology and Gravitation
 School of Energy and Electronic Engineering
 School of Mechanical and Design Engineering
 School of Mathematics and Physics
 Department for Learning at Work

Faculty of Science and Health
 School of Biological Sciences
 School of the Environment, Geography and Geosciences (includes Palaeontology)
 Dental Academy
 School of Health and Care Professions
 School of Pharmacy and Biomedical Sciences
 Department of Psychology
 School of Sport, Health and Exercise Science

Faculty of Humanities and Social Sciences
 Institute of Criminal Justice Studies
 School of Education and Childhood Studies
 School of Languages and Applied Linguistics
 School of Area Studies, History, Politics and Literature

Faculty of Creative and Cultural Industries
 Portsmouth School of Architecture
 School of Art, Design and Performance
 School of Film, Media and Communication
 School of Creative Technologies

Finances
The University of Portsmouth is worth £1.1 billion to the British economy and brings £476 million to the city, an independent assessment in 2017 has shown.

Academic profile
Portsmouth offers more than 200 undergraduate degrees and 150 postgraduate degrees, as well as 65 research degree programs.

The university formerly validated BSc (Hons) degrees in Acupuncture and MSc courses in Traditional Chinese medicine that were carried out by the London College of Traditional Acupuncture and Oriental Medicine, a private education provider that collapsed in early 2011.

Research
Over 60% of research submitted by the university to REF2014 was rated as world-leading and internationally excellent. In two subject areas respectively - Allied Health Professions, Dentistry, Nursing and Pharmacy, and Physics - 90% and 89% of all research submitted was rated as world leading and internationally excellent.

In 2017 Alessandro Melis and Steffen Lehmann created the interdisciplinary project CRUNCH: Climate Resilient Urban Nexus Choices: Operationalising the Food-Water-Energy Nexus. This is a £1.6 million research project funded by Horizon 2020, Belmont Forum, ESRC and other funding bodies. University of Portsmouth is leading the project. The partners are five universities from Miami, Eindhoven, Gdansk, Uppsala and Taiwan. Crunch involves universities, local authorities and small business.

Rankings

The University of Portsmouth is one of only four universities in the south east to achieve the highest Gold rating in the Teaching Excellence Framework (TEF).

Most recently, in the 2022 edition of the Good University Guide – compiled by The Times and Sunday Times – the university was ranked near the bottom at 88 out of 132.

Internationally, the university was ranked 98th in Times Higher Education's ‘100 under 50’ rankings of international modern universities 2017 but did not make the list in any subsequent year.

Portsmouth was rated in the top 501 – 600 universities in the world by the Times Higher Education World University Rankings 2022.

Student life

The University of Portsmouth Students’ Union (UPSU) is a registered charity that represents and supports all UoP students, who automatically become members upon registering for their course. The Students’ Union offers members support services, development opportunities and represent them at different levels throughout the university, in the community and beyond.

The earliest record of the Union is in the September 1911 edition of The Galleon student magazine. From 1965, the Union was based in Union House - now St Paul's Gym - on St Pauls Road. In 1983, it moved to the ex-NAAFI building, Alexandra House, where it remained for 19 years. Since 2002, the union has been situated at the north end of Ravelin Park.

The Union Advice Service offers confidential, impartial and non-judgemental support. The service delivers a range of academic & non-academic, information, advice, and guidance to the students of the University of Portsmouth and partner institutions. The service also undertakes other activities and events throughout the year to promote the health and wellbeing of students. The Advice Service is based in Gun House at The Union, next door to Cafe Coco. Portsmouth was named the UK's most affordable city for students in the Natwest Student Living Index 2016.

Societies and sports clubs
The Union supports a range of over 150 student-led groups that provide extra-curricular opportunities to students, including sports clubs, societies, media groups and volunteering opportunities. Students can also create new societies with the support of the Union.

The Students' Union offers a range of sports clubs which are administered by the Athletic Union The sports range from traditional team games like athletics, football, cricket, rugby union, netball, trampolining, and table tennis to octopush (a form of underwater hockey), lacrosse, polo and pole dancing. As of October 2020 there are 38 different sports clubs .

The Students' Union runs a number of volunteering projects, such as HEFCE's Volunteering Team of the Year. In 2010, the Union was awarded a £15,000 grant to work with elderly residents in the city.

Student media
The university has two functioning student media outlets. Spyglass, the student magazine,  and Pure FM, the student radio station, which works alongside local radio stations including Express FM. The university formerly had an active newspaper, The Galleon, as well as a video production society called Victory Studios.

Notable people

Faculty
 David Martill, professor of palaeontology
 Nizar Ibrahim, professor of palaeontology
 Claudia Maraston, professor of astrophysics and winner of the 2018 Eddington Medal
 Alessandro Melis, professor of architecture innovation and curator of the Italian Pavilione at the XVII Venice Biennale
 Neil Rackham, visiting professor at Portsmouth Business School and award-winning author
 David Wands, professor of cosmology at the Institute of Cosmology and Gravitation

Alumni

Notable students of the University of Portsmouth and its predecessor institutions include: 
 Mohammed Abubakar Adamu, former head of the Police of Nigeria
 Paola Arlotta, chair of the Regenerative Biology Department at Harvard University
 Simon Armitage, poet, playwright and novelist who was appointed poet laureate in 2019
 John Armitt, civil engineer and chairman of the Olympic Delivery Authority
 Ian Bishop, archdeacon of Macclesfield
 Jonathan Bullock, former member of the European Parliament for the East Midlands constituency
 Nira Chamberlain, principal consultant at SNC-Lavalin and president of the Institute of Mathematics and its Applications
 David Chidgey, Baron Chidgey, Liberal Democrat politician and former member of Parliament for Eastleigh  
 Ron Davies, former secretary of state for Wales and member of Parliament for Caerphilly 
 Chuck Easttom, computer scientist, author, and inventor
 John Flint, British banker and former chief executive officer of HSBC
 Ben Fogle, broadcaster, writer and adventurer 
 Christine Foyer, professor of plant science at Birmingham University
Tim Godwin, former police officer who served as deputy commissioner of Police of the Metropolis
 Casyo 'Krept' Johnson, London-based musician and half of Krept and Konan
Craig Jones, Royal Navy officer and campaigner
 Nick Kennedy, retired rugby union player and former director of rugby at London Irish 
 Rachel Lowe, businesswoman and developer of the Destination board games
 Diana Maddock, Baroness Maddock, former president of the Liberal Democrats and member of Parliament for Christchurch
 Ehsan Masood, science writer, journalist, broadcaster, and lecturer at Imperial College London
 Andrew Miller, former member of Parliament for Ellesmere Port and Neston
 Gerard Collier, 5th Baron Monkswell, politician and hereditary peer
 Darren Naish, vertebrate palaeontologist, author, science communicator, and scientific advisor to Netflix
 Tim Peake, Army Air Corps officer, European Space Agency astronaut, and former International Space Station crew member
 Grayson Perry, contemporary artist, writer, broadcaster, and recipient of the Turner Prize
 John Rees, national officer of the Stop the War Coalition and Visiting Research Fellow at Goldsmiths, University of London
 Vernon Ross, Archdeacon of Westmorland and Furness
 Carol Smart, feminist sociologist and academic at Manchester University
 Lauren Steadman, Paralympic athlete who competed in three summer Paralympics in both swimming and the paratriathlon
 Anthony Tucker-Jones, former defence intelligence officer and a widely published military expert 
 Martin Whitmarsh, businessman and chief executive of McLaren Racing

Notes

See also
 Armorial of UK universities
 List of universities in the UK
 Post-1992 universities

References

External links

 

 

 
Educational institutions established in 1992
University of Portsmouth
1992 establishments in England
Portsmouth
Portsmouth